The 2001 Tri Nations Series was contested from 21 July to 1 September between the Australia, New Zealand and South Africa national rugby union teams. The Wallabies won another thrilling game at Stadium Australia in Sydney with number eight Toutai Kefu scoring a try at the death in captain John Eales' final test match, to successfully defend the Tri Nations trophy.

Australia made it four wins in a row in the Bledisloe Cup, having taken it from New Zealand in 1998.

Table

Results

External links
Tri Nations at Rugby.com.au

Tri Nations
The Rugby Championship
Tri
Tri
Tri Nations